Courdimanche-sur-Essonne (literally Courdimanche on Essonne) is a commune in the Essonne department in Île-de-France in northern France.

Inhabitants of Courdimanche-sur-Essonne are known as Courdimanchois.

Geography

Climate

Courdimanche-sur-Essonne has a oceanic climate (Köppen climate classification Cfb).

See also
Communes of the Essonne department

References

External links

Official website

Mayors of Essonne Association 

Communes of Essonne